Selsey Beach railway station served the town of Selsey, West Sussex, England, from 1898 to 1904 on the West Sussex Railway.

History
The station was opened on 1 August 1898 by the West Sussex Railway. The handbook of stations states that it was only open in summer. It was a short-lived station, only being open for 6 years before closing in October 1904.

References

Disused railway stations in West Sussex
Railway stations in Great Britain opened in 1898
Railway stations in Great Britain closed in 1904
1898 establishments in England
1904 disestablishments in England